Stenotaenia is a genus of flowering plants in the family Apiaceae, native to Anatolia, the Transcaucasus, and Iran. Their fruit have numerous vittae on their dorsal and commissural surfaces, a trait shared with the genus Opopanax.

Species
Currently accepted species include:

Stenotaenia elbursensis Bornm.
Stenotaenia haussknechtii Boiss.
Stenotaenia macrocarpa Freyn & Sint.
Stenotaenia nudicaulis Boiss.
Stenotaenia tordylioides Boiss.

References

Apiaceae genera
Apiaceae